Janatar Aadalat is a 2008 romance-action Bengali film directed  by Manoj Thakur based on a story of Shaktipada Rajguru. Starring Jisshu Sengupta and Indrani Dutta is story of common men rising against oppressive powers and tortures of the local Member of Legislative Assembly.

Cast
 Jisshu Sengupta as Michael
 Indrani Dutta as Rekha
 Sabyasachi Chakraborty as superintendent of police
 Shubhendu Chattopadhyay as Master Mashai
 Monu Mukhopadhyay
 Tapas Paul
 Lily Chakravarty
 Sumit Ganguly
 Dulal Lahiri
 Ramaprasad Banik
 Sunil Mukherjee 
 Soma Chakraborty

References

External links
 

2008 films
2000s Bengali-language films
Bengali-language Indian films
Films based on works by Shaktipada Rajguru